Maarten Boudry (born 15 August 1984) is a Dutch-speaking Belgian philosopher and skeptic. He has been a researcher and teaching member of the Department of Philosophy and Moral Sciences at Ghent University since 2006. To date, he has published over 30 articles in various philosophy of science journals.

Academic background 
Boudry began his studies in philosophy at Ghent University in 2002, where he graduated cum laude in 2006. Between 2007 and 2011, he conducted research at Ghent University (Logic, History and Philosophy of Science), funded by a research grant from the Flemish foundation Fonds Wetenschappelijk Onderzoek (FWO). After obtaining his PhD, he became a postdoctoral fellow at Ghent University, again with the financial support of the FWO. In 2013, he was also a postdoctoral fellow at the Konrad Lorenz Institute in Vienna for six months, where he worked on the philosophical underpinnings of irrationality. Boudry has undertaken many foreign study visits. Additionally, he is a frequent speaker at international conferences and gives guest lectures at academic institutions.

Boudry is a member of a number of scientifically-oriented organizations: the Flemish skeptical organization SKEPP, the Society for the Scientific Study of Religion, the Center for Inquiry and the Imperfect Cognition research network of the Epistemic Innocence Project. He is also one of the founders of Het Denkgelag, which organizes skeptical conferences in Flanders.

Sokal affair 

In 2011, Boudry pulled a Sokal-style hoax. Boudry wanted to put Christian philosophers to the test by writing a meaningless abstract, full of theological jargon, with the title "The Paradoxes of Darwinian Disorder. Towards an Ontological Reaffirmation of Order and Transcendence". The abstract contained sentences such as, "In the Darwinian perspective, order is not immanent in reality, but it is a self-affirming aspect of reality in so far as it is experienced by situated subjects." Under the anagram-pseudonym Robert A. Maundy from the fictitious College of the Holy Cross in Reno, Nevada, Boudry submitted the abstract to the organizers of the Christian philosophical conference "The Future of Creation Order" at the VU University Amsterdam and the Centre of Theology and Philosophy at the University of Nottingham, which both accepted it without any reservations. The hoax, which Boudry revealed in mid-2012 on Facebook but became more widely known only after the American scientist Jerry Coyne blogged about it, received attention in a number of Dutch Protestant newspapers such as Reformatorisch Dagblad, Trouw, and Nederlands Dagblad.

When asked in an interview with the Dutch popular philosophy magazine Filosofie Magazine about the reason for the hoax, Boudry said the following:

No one had discovered that "Robert A. Maundy" and the "College of the Holy Cross" did not exist. Gerrit Glas, president of the conference at the time, found the text to be odd and said they had hesitated for a long time, but ultimately decided to give "Maundy" the benefit of the doubt. Glas admitted that he should have been more critical and defended himself by saying that "it is not uncommon for texts on process theology, negative theology, and postmodernism to be inscrutable". Philosopher of religion Taede A. Smedes at the Radboud University Nijmegen considered Boudry's action to be unworthy of an academic, but also found it astonishing that the conference organizers had accepted the text: "Anyone who makes the simple effort to understand the first sentences of  abstract (if that is even possible), will immediately notice that it is incomprehensible nonsense."

Skepticism 

Maarten Boudry is mainly known for his skepticism and critical attitude toward pseudoscience. As a philosopher of science, one of his main interests is the study of pseudoscience in all its forms and expressions. He studies the fallibility of human reasoning that might underlie pseudoscience and irrationality. Boudry characterizes pseudoscience as "an imitation of real science". In his MA thesis, entitled De naakte Keizers van de Psychoanalyse (The Naked Emperors of Psychoanalysis), he explains why he classifies psychoanalysis as a pseudoscience and which immunizing strategies this school of thought has developed over the years to withstand criticism. Together with philosopher Johan Braeckman he wrote the book De ongelovige Thomas heeft een punt (Doubting Thomas has a point), in which they offer arguments against parascience and pseudoscience, blind faith, wishful thinking, astrology, irrationality, psychokinesis, and dowsing, as they consider these ideas to be grounded in logical fallacies. The title refers to the attitude of Thomas the Apostle, who was initially skeptical when he was told that Jesus had been resurrected. In an interview, Boudry said:

In publications and debates, Boudry also criticizes religion, intelligent design, and theology. In 2014, during the Dutch Nationale Religiedebat (National Religion Debate), philosophers Maarten Boudry and Herman Philipse (both of whom are atheists) debated Stefan Paas and Rik Peels on the question of whether belief in a god is reasonable and what the impact of nonbelief on morality is. Boudry also debated Christian philosopher Emanuel Rutten during the Denkcafé debate "Does God Exist?" in December 2012, where he said the following:

Awards 
 2007: SKEPP-prize for best thesis on immunizing strategies in psychoanalysis.
 2011: Liberales book of the year for De ongelovige Thomas heeft een punt
 2012: Shortlist ‘Socrates Wisselbeker Filosofie’ for the book De ongelovige Thomas heeft een punt
 2013: Shortlist Science Communication Award, Royal Flemish Academy of Belgium for Science and the Arts
 2015, Illusies voor gevorderden. Of waarom waarheid altijd beter is, Polis,

Selected publications 

Maarten Boudry has published a considerable number of articles in both peer-reviewed philosophical journals and in public print media (newspapers and magazines). Some of his conference presentations are publicly available as well.

Bibliography 
 2006, De naakte Keizers van de Psychoanalyse. De Immunisatiestrategieën van een Pseudowetenschap (MA thesis)
 2011, Here be Dragons. Exploring the Hinterland of Science (PhD dissertation)
 2011, De ongelovige Thomas heeft een punt (co-author Johan Braeckman), Houtekiet, 
 2013, Philosophy of Pseudoscience: Reconsidering the Demarcation Problem (co-author Massimo Pigliucci), 
 2015, Illusies voor gevorderden. Of waarom waarheid altijd beter is, Polis, 
 2018, Science Unlimited?: The Challenges of Scientism (co-author Massimo Pigliucci) 
 2019, Waarom de wereld niet naar de knoppen gaat, Polis, .
 2019, Alles wat in dit boek staat is waar (en andere denkfouten), Polis (co-author Jeroen Hopster, Polis,

References

External links 

Official blog

1984 births
Living people
21st-century Belgian philosophers
Belgian atheists
Philosophers of science
Belgian skeptics
Ghent University alumni
People from Moorslede
Critics of religions